Tim Maculan (born April 20, 1963) is an American film and television actor known for his recurring roles on Six Feet Under and Cybill.

Early life and education

Maculan was born in Rockford, Illinois. He started acting in high school productions as well as in local community and professional theaters. He worked at the Falmouth Playhouse with Van Johnson and William Shatner. Maculan studied at the School of the Art Institute of Chicago and the Theatre School at DePaul University. He later left Chicago for New York City, where he began his professional acting career working in summer stock and regional theatre across the United States.

Career

Film and television 
Maculan has guest starred in over thirty television shows, including Dexter, Grey’s Anatomy, Entourage, The Drew Carey Show, Friends, The Larry Sanders Show, Married... with Children, and Aaron Spelling’s Love Boat: The Next Wave. Maculan’s character on Cybill earned him a GLAAD media award nomination in 1997.

Some of Maculan's film work includes Spider-Man 3 (by director Sam Raimi), Inside Out (with Steven Weber), Matchstick Men (by director Ridley Scott), Duplex (with Ben Stiller and Drew Barrymore).

Theatre
A founding member of The Actors Space, Inc. in New York, Maculan appeared in their revival of A Hatful of Rain and an earned critical acclaim for his work in Found a Peanut – a show that would launch his career in television when it was remounted in Los Angeles. Maculan created the role of Ezra Twain in the world premiere of Diva at the La Jolla Playhouse in San Diego, California, worked in a national tour of Beauty and the Beast as Cogsworth, a production of South Pacific for the North Carolina Theatre of Raleigh, North Carolina. Maculan starred in Gary Garrison's collection of plays, Verticals and Horizontals at the Cherry Lane Theatre in New York City.

Filmography

Film

Television

References

External links
 
 
 

1963 births
Male actors from Illinois
American male film actors
American male television actors
Living people